Heinz Pollay (4 February 1908 in Köslin, Pomerania – 14 May 1979) was a German (later West German) horse rider who competed in dressage from the late 1930s to the early 1950s. Competing in two Summer Olympics, he won two golds (Dressage individual and Dressage team: both 1936) and one bronze (Dressage team: 1952).

Pollay took the Judge's Oath at the 1972 Summer Olympics in Munich, the first for an official in the Summer Olympics to do so.

References

External links
DatabaseOlympics.com profile
IOC 1972 Summer Olympics
Wallechinsky, David (1984). "Equestrian: Dressage, Individual" and "Equestrian: Dressage, Team". In The Complete Book of the Olympics: 1896-1980. New York: Penguin Books. pp. 236, 237, 239, 240.

1908 births
1979 deaths
People from Koszalin
People from the Province of Pomerania
Sportspeople from West Pomeranian Voivodeship
Equestrians at the 1936 Summer Olympics
Equestrians at the 1952 Summer Olympics
German dressage riders
Olympic equestrians of Germany
German male equestrians
Olympic medalists in equestrian
Olympic officials
Medalists at the 1952 Summer Olympics
Medalists at the 1936 Summer Olympics
Olympic gold medalists for Germany
Olympic bronze medalists for Germany
Oath takers at the Olympic Games